Luke Preston (born 26 May 1976) is a Welsh judoka.

Biography
The oldest of three brothers, Preston grew up in Criftins, Shropshire. As a child, he attended Criftins CE School (primary education), followed by Lakelands Academy, Ellesmere. He is a three times champion of Great Britain, winning the half-middleweight division at the British Judo Championships in 1997, 1999 and 2000.

At the 2002 Commonwealth Games in Manchester, representing Wales he claimed the bronze medal in the -81kg division. He would have undoubtedly gained more success but was unfortunate to have been competing at the same time and in the same weight category as fellow British judoka Graeme Randall and Euan Burton.

Achievements

References

 

Welsh male judoka
Commonwealth Games bronze medallists for Wales
1976 births
Living people
Commonwealth Games medallists in judo
Judoka at the 2002 Commonwealth Games
Medallists at the 2002 Commonwealth Games